The 1982 Baltimore International, also known by its sponsored name First National Classic, was a men's tennis tournament played on indoor carpet courts at the Towson State College in Baltimore, Maryland in the United States that was part of the 1982 World Championship Tennis circuit. It was the tenth, and last, edition of the event and was held from November 1 through November 7, 1982. Second-seeded Paul McNamee won the singles title.

Finals

Singles
 Paul McNamee defeated  Guillermo Vilas 4–6, 7–5, 7–5, 2–6, 6–3  
 It was McNamee's 1st singles title of the year and the 2nd of his career.

Doubles
 Anand Amritraj /  Tony Giammalva defeated  Vijay Amritraj /  Fred Stolle 7–5, 6–2

References

External links
 ITF tournament edition details

Baltimore International
Baltimore International
Baltimore International
Baltimore International